Bragança Airport  is a regional airport serving Bragança, Portugal.

Airlines and destinations
The following airlines operate regular scheduled and charter flights at Bragança Airport:

Accidents and incidents
On 8 May 1994, an Aerocondor Britten-Norman Trislander, registered CS-DAF, operating the Lisbon–Bragança route, crash-landed into trees near the airport, following loss of power. There were no reported fatalities but the aircraft was written off.

See also
Transport in Portugal
List of airports in Portugal
National Institute of Civil Aviation of Portugal

References

Airports in Portugal
Buildings and structures in Bragança District